William Preston Corderman (December 1, 1904 in Hagerstown, Maryland – March 4, 1998 in Fort Belvoir, Virginia) was a United States Army general.

From July 1, 1943 to September 14, 1945, Corderman was commander of the Signals Security Agency. From September 15, 1945 to March 31, 1946, he was Chief of the U.S. Army Security Agency.

Corderman was promoted to the rank of Major General on July 1, 1951.

General Corderman is a member of the Military Intelligence Hall of Fame.

1904 births
1998 deaths
United States Army generals
United States Army personnel of World War II
People from Hagerstown, Maryland